Ark Airways is a cargo airline from Armenia, founded in 2010. It has its main hub at the Zvartnots International Airport. Its fleet consists of one B747-200 and seven Ilyushin Il-76/78/A-50 aircraft.

Fleet

See also
 List of airlines of Armenia
 Transport in Armenia

References 

Airlines of Armenia
Airlines established in 2010
Armenian companies established in 2010